Jean Claessens was a Belgian footballer born 18 June 1908 in  Anderlecht (Belgium), died 1978.

Biography 
Claessens was a midfielder for the invincible Union Saint-Gilloise triple Belgian champions from 1933 to 1935. He was a freekick specialist.

He played 21 matches for Belgium from 1932 to 1936. He played in one game at the 1934 World Cup in Italy.

He finished his career as player-coach at RAEC Mons after the War.

Honours
 Belgian international from 1932 to 1936 (21 caps)
 First cap : 17 April 1932, Netherlands-Belgium, 2-1 (friendly)
 Participation in the 1934 World Cup in Italy (1 match)
 Belgian champions in 1933, 1934 and 1935 with R. Union Saint-Gilloise

References

External links
 

1908 births
1978 deaths
Belgian footballers
Belgium international footballers
1934 FIFA World Cup players
Royale Union Saint-Gilloise players
R.A.E.C. Mons players
Belgian football managers
People from Anderlecht

Association football midfielders
Footballers from Brussels